Rockford Rage is a women's flat track roller derby league based in Rockford, Illinois. Founded in 2006, the league consists of a single team which competes against teams from other leagues. Rockford is a member of the Women's Flat Track Derby Association (WFTDA).

History
The league was founded in mid-2006 by Rebecca Engebretson and others, with its first practices held in the parking lot of a Borders bookstore. Its first bout was played in December, 2006, an interleague contest between the Demolition Dolls and the Screw City Slammers, part of a four team inter-league squad that also included the Midwest Maulers and the Rollitas. The bout attracted 650 fans. In 2009, the league attracted attention for its abandonment of smoking breaks. This was the same year that the Rockford Rage converted into a traveling team format, forming an All Star team and a B team called the Rockford Rag Dolls.  The B team and the inter-league teams have since been disbanded, leaving the current All Star roster.

Rockford was accepted into the Women's Flat Track Derby Association Apprentice Program in September 2009, and became a full member of the WFTDA in June 2010.

In 2016, the Indoor Sports Center was renovated to accommodate Soccer, so the Rockford Rage was forced to seek a new venue.  While activity picked up as a travel team, local venues were few and far between, and the Boone County Fairgrounds was used as a temporary home in 2017.  An agreement with the UW Sports Factory in downtown Rockford was struck in late 2017, and the announcement was made that the downtown Rockford venue would become their new home.  March 24, 2018 will be the first time the Rockford Rage skates a home bout within the city limits of Rockford, IL.

WFTDA rankings

NR = no final ranking assigned this year

References

Rage
Roller derby leagues established in 2006
Roller derby leagues in Illinois
Women's Flat Track Derby Association Division 3
2006 establishments in Illinois